Interstate 75 (I-75) runs from near Williamsburg to Covington by way of Lexington in the US state of Kentucky. I-75 enters the Cumberland Plateau region from Tennessee, then descends into the Bluegrass region through the Pottsville Escarpment before crossing the Ohio River into Ohio. I-75 follows along the U.S. Route 25 (US 25) corridor for the entire length of Kentucky.

Route description

I-75 runs roughly parallel to US 25 for its entire length in Kentucky. The freeway enters Kentucky south of Williamsburg in the Cumberland Plateau, bypassing Corbin and London before descending into the Bluegrass region near Berea through the Pottsville Escarpment. The highway continues north through Richmond en route to Lexington. It meets and then becomes briefly concurrent with I-64 along the north and east sides of Lexington, before leaving the Lexington area northerly and bypassing Georgetown en route to Cincinnati, Ohio. Just south of Florence, the route enters the Cincinnati metropolitan area and becomes concurrent with I-71. The two routes remain concurrent through to Downtown Cincinnati. On the north side of Florence, I-75 intersects with the only auxiliary route it has in the state, I-275, a beltway bypass of the greater Cincinnati area. It then passes through Covington and crosses the Ohio River via the lower level of the Brent Spence Bridge into Ohio.

History
The stretch through Covington originally included hills and curves steeper than those recommended for Interstate Highway standards. As a result, the northbound descent into Cincinnati, known as Cut-in-the-Hill, was nicknamed "Death Hill". It is a steep descent into the valley of the Ohio River between Kyles Lane and the Brent Spence Bridge leading into Downtown Cincinnati. The hill is known for its high number of automobile accidents. In 2006, the Cut-in-the-Hill averaged over seven times more accidents when compared to similar roadways in Kentucky.

Accidents are usually attributed to a combination of speeding, curvy lanes, poor weather, longer stopping times for trucks traveling downhill, and traffic congestion.

The area earned the sobriquet "Death Hill"  shortly after I-75 opened in 1962. By 1968, a total of 23 people died in crashes on the hill, so a concrete wall was installed to separate northbound and southbound traffic. The wall helped reduce fatal crashes, but accidents continued, and, in 1977, the hill averaged 583 automobile accidents per year.

In 1986, a tractor-trailer lost control, leading to an accident that caused a Northern Kentucky University student to burn to death in his car. As a result, Governor Martha Layne Collins banned most northbound tractor-trailer traffic from the hill. From 1989 until 1994, $50 million (equivalent to $ in ) in reconstruction was spent to straighten the hill's S-curve and add a fourth lane for southbound traffic, and, in 1995, the truck ban was lifted. Also as part of the reconstruction, ramps were added at Pike Street to give complete access, while an interchange with Jefferson and Euclid avenues was obliterated.

In 2006, the hill and the Brent Spence Bridge saw 151 crashes in the northbound direction and 121 crashes in the southbound direction, totaling 272 in all. To help reduce the number of accidents, a flashing "Steep Grade" sign was installed and a Kentucky State Police trooper was assigned to patrol just the Cut-in-the-Hill. Additionally, eight radar speed signs were installed in 2007 to remind motorists to drive a safer speed.

The Cut-in-the-Hill was originally designed to carry up to 80,000 vehicles per day, but, in 2006, it carried 155,000 daily. Kentucky officials are reportedly working to raise more than $2 billion to replace the section of highway, but, no construction is planned.

Exit list

Notes

References

External links

 Kentucky
75
0075
Transportation in Whitley County, Kentucky
Transportation in Laurel County, Kentucky
Transportation in Rockcastle County, Kentucky
Transportation in Madison County, Kentucky
Transportation in Scott County, Kentucky
Transportation in Grant County, Kentucky
Transportation in Kenton County, Kentucky
Transportation in Boone County, Kentucky